Epsom College is a co-educational independent school on Epsom Downs, Surrey, England, for pupils aged 11 to 18. It was founded in 1853 as a benevolent institution which provided a boarding school education for sons of poor or deceased members of the medical profession and also accommodation for pensioned doctors. The college soon after foundation opened to pupils from outside the medical profession. Over time the charitable work for medical professionals in hardship moved to a separate charity.  By 1996 the school was fully co-educational and now takes day pupils throughout. The headteacher is a member of the Headmasters' and Headmistresses' Conference.

Foundation
The school was founded in 1853 by John Propert as The Royal Medical Benevolent College, with the aim to provide accommodation for pensioned medical doctors or their widows and to provide a "liberal education" to 100sons of "duly qualified medical men" for £25 each year.

The establishment of the college was the culmination of a campaign begun in 1844 by the Provincial Medical and Surgical Association, the forerunner of the British Medical Association. The scheme saw the medical profession was "in regard to charitable institutions for the aged and infirm, the widow and the orphan, the worst provided of all professions and callings" and took as its aim the alleviating of poverty and debt. Discussions were chaired by Sir John Forbes, Physician to Prince Albert and the Royal Household, and followed similar plans establishing schools for the Clergy and the Royal Navy in desiring to raise money to found "schools for the sons of medical men", providing an education which would otherwise be "beyond the means of many parents".

By 1851, the Medical Benevolent Society had limited itself to the foundation of a single Benevolent College and met in Treasurer John Propert's house in New Cavendish Street, Marylebone. The new campaign's fund-raising activities included dinners, which numerous doctors and Members of Parliament attended, and concerts, for example at one such event, on 4 July 1855, composer Hector Berlioz conducted the UK premiere of his symphonic suite Harold in Italy.

The foundation stone was laid on 6 July 1853. Almost two years later, on 25 June 1855, the college was formally opened by Prince Albert and his son, the future King Edward VII, in front of an unexpectedly large crowd of around 6,000. In March 1855, Queen Victoria consented to become patron, and the school's relationship with British monarchs has continued since. King Edward VII became patron after the death of his mother, followed by King George V in 1936, King George VI in 1937, and Queen Elizabeth II.

In 1980, it was estimated by a history of the college that a third of its 10,000 alumni had entered the medical profession.

Development and charity
It was founded in 1855 to support poor members of the medical profession. Funding for such a bold undertaking proved inadequate, resulting in a reduced number of buildings and insufficient space to support 100 pensioners and 100 boys. In the 1860s, partially due to this, the school was opened up to children of non-medical parents. In subsequent decades, pensioners were supported off-site until there were none on campus by the end of the 19th century. These moves mark the transition towards the college becoming a public school in the modern sense. 

The college continued its charitable activities, alongside its strictly educational role, throughout the 20th century. It was only in 2000 that the Royal Medical Foundation was formed as a separate entity, funding the support of four Foundationers at the college, 27 outside it, and paying 20 pensions and supporting one doctor at a medical home.

In the 1920s, the junior school side of the college was run down, and thereafter it catered only for 13- to 18-year-olds. In 1976, girls were first allowed into the sixth form. Twenty years later, the school became fully co-educational.

Its campus is on the outskirts of Epsom, near Epsom Downs on the North Downs, near the racecourse, home to the annual Epsom Derby. Its buildings date from 1853 and are mostly influenced by the Gothic revival architecture, described by Prince Albert as the "pointed style of the 14th Century". In 1974, the main building and the College Chapel attained Grade II listed status.

Epsom College in Malaysia

In 2009, the college announced the foundation of a new school in Bandar Enstek, just south of Kuala Lumpur. Epsom College in Malaysia was officially opened in September 2014.  The school offers a British educational style for pupils aged three to eighteen years. Students are also offered a wide variety of recreational and competitive sporting opportunities, such as badminton, squash, hockey, tennis, and swimming.

OFT inquiry

In 2005 the school was one of fifty of the country's leading independent schools which were found guilty of running an illegal price-fixing cartel, exposed by The Times newspaper, although the schools made clear that they had not realised that the change to the law (which had happened only a few months earlier) about the sharing of information had subsequently made it an offence. Each school was required to pay a nominal penalty of £10,000 and all agreed to make ex-gratia payments totalling three million pounds into a trust designed to benefit pupils who attended the schools during the period in respect of which fee information was shared.

Jean Scott, the then-head of the Independent Schools Council, said that independent schools had always been exempt from anti-cartel rules applied to business, were following a long-established procedure in sharing the information with each other, and that they were unaware of the change to the law (on which they had not been consulted). She wrote to John Vickers, the OFT director-general, saying, "They are not a group of businessmen meeting behind closed doors to fix the price of their products to the disadvantage of the consumer. They are schools that have quite openly continued to follow a long-established practice because they were unaware that the law had changed".

Failed Inspection

In 2021, a regulatory compliance inspection by the Independent Schools Inspectorate found that the college was not meeting its statutory requirements in respect of safeguarding, safeguarding of boarders, behaviour and measures to prevent bullying, and that the standards relating to leadership and management of the school were not met. A short visit the following year after the appointment of a new head (Emma Pattison) focusing on these issues found that they had been rectified and the standards were now met.

Death of head teacher and family 
On 5 February 2023, headteacher Emma Pattison, her husband George, and their seven-year-old daughter Lettie were found dead in their residence, the Head's House, on the school's grounds. Pattison, who was the school's first female head, was appointed headteacher in September 2022 after six years as head teacher of Croydon High School. Surrey Police suspect that George Pattison had killed his wife and daughter with a firearm, before committing suicide. 

Paul Williams was appointed as acting head immediately, with Sir Anthony Seldon, former head of Wellington College, announced as interim head on 17 February 2023 in an email to parents. He is due to be headmaster from 1 March 2023-September 2024.

Houses

House colours are seen in the stripes in the ties worn by the majority of boys (those not wearing colours or prefects' ties); on a rectangular brooch occasionally worn by the girls; and at the neck of girl's school pullovers. They are also used in house rugby and athletics tops.

Sport

Association football
Association football became the major sport for boys in the Lent Term in 2014. Previously the sport was an option and played at Sixth Form level only. Now it is played across all age groups from Under 12 to U18. The college is currently part of the Southern Independent Schools Lent Term League.

Rifle shooting
Epsom College has a long history of target rifle shooting, both small-bore and full-bore, and over the last 40 years, has consistently been the premier rifle shooting school in the UK. The college rifle team has won the national schools fullbore championships – the Ashburton Shield – 15 times, holding the record for the highest number of Ashburton wins by a single school., thus making it as one of the best rifle teams in the country. They have won the Ashburton Shield, the premiere event at the annual Schools' Rifle Championships more often than any other school, recording a record-breaking 15th Ashburton win in 2011 (the 150th year of the competition).

Rugby football
Rugby football is a major boys' sport during the Michaelmas term. Rugby sevens is played in the Lent Term. In 2001, the Epsom College U15 team won their age group in Daily Mail Cup, beating The John Fisher School by 17–12 at Twickenham in the Final. In 2006, the U16 Epsom sevens team won the 2006 Sevens National Championship at Rosslyn Park by beating Millfield 29–19. In 2005 Epsom College U15 Team lost to Bedford 10–5 in the Semi-final of the Daily Mail competition.

The Epsom College Director of Rugby is former Ireland international Paul Burke.

Eccentricities

Air raid shelters
During the Second World War, in preparation for the possibility of attack from the air, several air raid shelters were built, the outlines of which are still visible in aerial photographs and satellite imagery as a row of negative cropmarks in the grass on the Chapel Triangle. In his 1944 book, Sunday After The War, Henry Miller called these "shelters from aerial bombardment".

The fives courts
Near Wilson Pitch, there are the remnants of several open-air fives courts, one of which is said to be a doubles court. In the late 1960s, these were functional courts, albeit of odd design.

Heads
(1855–1870) Robinson Thornton
(1870–1885) The Rev. William de Lancy West
(1885–1889) The Rev. William Cecil Wood
(1889–1914) The Rev. Thomas Northcote Hart-Smith
(1914–1922) The Rev. Canon Walter John Barton
(1922–1939) The Rev. Canon Arnold Cecil Powell
(1939–1962) Henry William Fernehough Franklin
(1962–1970) Archibald Duncan Dougal MacCallum
(1970–1982) Owen John Tressider Rowe
(1982–1992) John B. Cook
(1993–2000) Anthony Beadles
(2000–2012) Stephen Borthwick
(2012–2022) Jay Piggot
(2022–2023) Emma Pattison
(2023) Paul Williams (acting)
(2023–present) Sir Anthony Seldon (interim)

Southern Railway Schools Class
The school lent its name to the thirty-eighth steam locomotive (Engine 937) in the Southern Railway's Class V, of which there were 40. This class was also known as the Schools Class because all 40 of the class were named after prominent English public schools. 'Epsom', as it was called, was built in 1934. The locomotive bearing the school's name was withdrawn in the early 1960s.

Notable pupils

A to D
 Alexander Gordon (Alick) Bearn (C 1936–1940) (b 29 March 1923, d 15 May 2009). A pioneering geneticist known for his research into Wilson's disease
 Roland Boys Bradford (left 1907) (23 February 1892 – 30 November 1917) recipient of the Victoria Cross during First World War
 Jeaffreson Vennor Brewer (1866–1870) rugby union international for England in 1875
 Professor Neville Butler (G 1933–1935) (b 6 July 1920, d 22 February 2007), paediatrician
 Paul Burke (G 1989–1991), Irish International Rugby Union Fly-half.
 Christian Candy (Rn 1989–1993)
 Nick Candy (Rn 1986–1991)
 Alex Carlile, Baron Carlile of Berriew, CBE, QC (born 12 February 1948), Liberal Democrat member of the House of Lords.
 Warwick Charlton (b 9 March 1918, d 10 December 2002, conceived of, built, and sailed the Mayflower II, a replica of the Mayflower, in 1957 from Plymouth, Devon, to Plymouth, Massachusetts
 Alice Davidson-Richards, (b 29 May 1994) England Cricketer
 Tyger Drew-Honey (C 2009– ) (b 26 January 1996), Child actor best known for his role in the hit BBC sitcom Outnumbered.
 Alastair Dickenson, Silver expert

E to K
 McCormack Charles Farrell Easmon (left 1907), Doctor, Campaigner for Racial Equality in Sierra Leone, and founder of the Sierra Leone Museum
 Charles Syrett Farrell Easmon, CBE, MD, PhD, MRCP, FRCPath, FMedSci, (1946), British microbiologist and medical professor
 Michael Fallon, Member of Parliament for Sevenoaks and former Secretary of State for Defence.
 Tony Fernandes (H 1977–1983), a Malaysian entrepreneur, CEO and founder of AirAsia.
 Geoffrey Gillam FRCP (28 January 1905 – 15 February 1970) (left 1923), consultant cardiologist
 Stewart Granger (6 May 1913 – 16 August 1993) (left 1923), Hollywood Actor
 Sir Charles Felix Harris (b 30 March 1900, New York, d 10 March 1974) Vice Chancellor of London University from 1958 to 1961
 Sir Alfred Bakewell Howitt (1879–1954), doctor and Conservative Member of Parliament
Keith Irvine, interior designer
Ciara Janson, (Cr 2000–2004) (b 27 April 1987) Actress (best known as Nicole Owen from Hollyoaks)
 Richard Stanley Leigh Jones (R 1953–1958) (born 1940), Australian parliamentarian.
Desmond King-Hele, (R 1941–1945) (b 3 November 1927) physicist and author.

L to R
 Derek (William) Lambert (b 10 October 1929, d 2001), Thriller writer, also journalist
 Professor Suzannah Lipscomb, a historian, academic and broadcaster who specialises in the sixteenth century. She has presented programmes across the BBC and on Britain's Channel 4 Television and ITV networks, and on National Geographic Channel, The History Channel (now known as 'History') and on the Public Broadcasting Service in the United States.
 George Lowe (b 22 October 1989), a professional rugby union footballer for Harlequins in the Guinness Premiership.
 Philip Gadesden Lucas, (C 1918-1918) (b 1902, d 1981) George Medallist.
 Sir Anthony McCowan, (b 12 January 1928, d 3 July 2003), Lord Justice of Appeal from 1989 to 1997
 Alan McGlashan, (P 1010-1916) (20 October 1898 in Bedworth, Nottinghamshire – 6 May 1977 in London) psychiatrist, pilot, author and theatre critic
 Ross McGowan, (born 23 April 1982), English professional golfer.
 Sir Halford John Mackinder (b 1861, d 1947), Geographer
 Gyles Mackrell, (P 1898-1905) (b 1888, d 1959), George Medallist.
 Jonathan Maitland (Cr 1974–1979), ITV Television journalist
 Mark Mardell, BBC North America Editor; fmr. BBC Europe Editor; Television Journalist, Radio Journalist
Ian Fraser Muir (b 1921, d 2008), Plastic surgeon
 Julian Nott scientist and balloonist who set more than 100 records, including reaching 55,000 feet	
 Colonel Chukwuemeka Odumegwu Ojukwu (4 November 1933 – 26 November 2011) (H 1947 – 1952), Son of Sir Louis Odumegwu Ojukwu, Nigerian Army Officer and politician. Ojukwu served as the military governor of the Eastern Region of Nigeria in 1966, the leader of the breakaway Republic of Biafra from 1967 to 1970 and a leading Nigerian politician from 1983 to 2011, when he died, aged 78. Leader of Biafra during the war with Nigeria
 Parag Patel (1989–1994), Full bore rifle Commonwealth Games Gold Medallist 2006 and 2010
 John Piper (left 1919) (b 13 December 1903 – d 1992), Cubist artist
 Sir Philip Powell, (b 15 March 1921, d 5 May 2003) half of one of the most important British architectural partnerships – Powell & Moya – with Hidalgo Moya, of the post-war period
 Major-General Jim Robertson, (b 23 March 1910, d. 11 February 2004), (C 1924–1928), commanded the 1/7th Gurkha Rifles in Burma and the 1/6th Gurkha Rifles in Malaya; a formidable field commander, he was awarded two DSOs and was four times mentioned in dispatches.

S to Z
 Sir John Scarlett, head of the British Secret Intelligence Service (MI6) (2004–2009). He is currently [2013] a governor.
 Natalie Sciver, (b 20 August 1994) England Cricketer
 Sergeant Robert George Scott (b 22 April 1857, d 3 October 1918) 99G 1870–1871)  VC, DSO, won his Victoria Cross (VC) on 8 April 1879 at Morosi's Mountain, South Africa during the Basuto War.
 Adrian Shooter, founding chairman of Chiltern Railways and of Vivarail
 Kyle Sinckler, professional rugby union player for Bristol, England and the British and Irish Lions
 Flaxman Charles John Spurrell, Archaeologist and Photographer
 Air Vice-Marshal Graham Stacey (Fayrer 1973–77), appointed Commander British Forces Cyprus 2010
 Graham Sutherland (b 24 August 1903, d 17 February 1980) (G 1918–1919) Artist
 Jeremy Vine (b 17 May 1965) (H 1976–1982), BBC Television journalist and Radio Presenter
 Tim Vine (b 1967) (H 1980–1985), comedian
 Sir David Warren, (Cr 1965–1970), (b 1952), in 2010 British Ambassador to Japan.
 Peter Edward Darrell Sheldon Wilkinson (b 1919, d 2009), dermatologist
 Sir Graham Wilson, bacteriologist
 Nicholas Witchell, BBC Television journalist
 Julian Worricker (R 1976–1980), BBC Radio journalist

Notable staff
 Robert (Bob) Roseveare, (b 23 May 1923, d 8 December 2004) Bletchley Park cryptographer
 Nigel Starmer-Smith, Taught Geography while scrum-half for the England rugby union team, prior to his TV Rugby commentary role at the BBC
 Paul Burke, head of rugby from 2016, former Irish International professional rugby union footballer.

Coat of Arms

References

Further reading and sources
 145 pages.
 134 pages.

External links

Alumni
Old Epsomian Lodge
Royal Medical Foundation web site
Profile at the Good Schools Guide
Profile on the ISC website
Epsom College in Malaysia

Boarding schools in Surrey
Private schools in Surrey
Member schools of the Headmasters' and Headmistresses' Conference
Epsom
 
Educational institutions established in 1853
Grade II listed buildings in Surrey
Grade II listed educational buildings
1853 establishments in England